Hung Jury is the second and final studio album by American singer Michel'le. It was her first album in nearly nine years at the time of its release and her most recent studio album to date. The album was released on August 24, 1998, by Death Row Records and Priority Records and was produced by Michel'le and Suge Knight. Two singles that were released were "Hang Tyme" and "Can I Get a Witness?".

Commercial performance
Unlike her highly successful debut album, this album had limited promotion due to the declining label's many highly-publicized controversies which resulted in poor sales;  it peaked at #56 on the Top R&B/Hip-Hop Albums chart and failed to produce any hit singles. The album sold 91,000 units to date in the United States.

Track listing

Credits and personnel

Patrice Adams, Terrance Downs, Tara Fletcher, Vicky Lowery
Michel'le – Lead Vocals, Backing Vocals, Producer, Vocal Arrangement
Steve Capp – Engineer
Craig Lane – Keyboards, Composer, Arranger, Producer
David Thomasson, Trevor Lawrence – Saxophone
Craig "Butt" Eator – Vocal Arrangement, Producer 
Ricky Rouse – Guitar
Keston Wright – Engineer, Mixer 
Reggie Lamb – Composer, Vocal Arrangement, Backing Vocals
Carl "Butch" Small – Percussion, Arranger, Mixer, Producer
Frank Wilson – Composer 

Warren Woods – Mixer, Engineer 
Steve Grisette – Composer 
Cameron Webb – Engineer
Sage – Background Vocals
Marvin Paige – Vocal Arrangement, Producer
Lou Donaldson – Composer 
Kyle "Majik" Jackson – Producer, Drum Programmer 
David L. Stewart – Producer
Kenny Ochoa – Engineer 
Regg – Mixer, Vocal Arrangement, Producer
Suge Knight – Executive-Producer, Producer

Charts

References

1998 albums
Michel'le albums
Death Row Records albums